KUAT-FM is a radio station in Tucson, Arizona, United States. One of two radio services operated by the University of Arizona (UA) through its Arizona Public Media arm, it broadcasts a classical format throughout Southern Arizona. Studios are in the Modern Languages Building on the UA campus.

History
The UA applied at the start of 1974 to build an FM radio station that would primarily broadcast classical music; at the time, KUAT (1550 AM) primarily broadcast classical and jazz music. Federal Communications Commission (FCC) approval came at year's end, delayed by issues with a treaty between the United States and Mexico, and when KUAT-FM began on May 19, 1975, the classical and news/jazz services split.

Programming
The broadcast schedule consists of playlists announced by local hosts, as well as nationally syndicated broadcasts, including those from the San Francisco Symphony, the Cleveland Orchestra, the Milwaukee Symphony Orchestra, the New York Philharmonic, the Metropolitan Opera and San Francisco Opera during their seasons, the Exploring Music program with host Bill McGlaughlin, and the Radio Netherlands Live! at the Concertgebouw series. On Sundays, the NPR program From the Top, showcasing young classical musicians, is heard on KUAT, as well as Community Concerts, a program of classical music from the University of Arizona School of Music (as well as other groups performing at local venues throughout southern Arizona). KUAT is also the broadcast home of the Tucson Symphony Orchestra.

During the overnight hours, the Classical 24 service is heard.

Translators
KUAT-FM has translators throughout southeastern Arizona, as well as one on Tumamoc Hill in Tucson which serves areas shaded from the main Mount Bigelow transmitter by terrain.

References

External links
 KUAT-FM official website
 

UAT-FM
Radio stations established in 1975
1975 establishments in Arizona
University of Arizona
Classical music radio stations in the United States
NPR member stations